The Boston Red Sox are a Major League Baseball franchise based in Boston, Massachusetts, also known in their early years as the "Boston Americans" (1901–1907). They play in the American League East division. Pitchers for the Red Sox have thrown 18 no-hitters in franchise history.

A no-hitter is officially recognized by Major League Baseball "when a pitcher (or pitchers) allows no hits during the entire course of a game, which consists of at least nine innings. In a no-hit game, a batter may reach base via a walk, an error, a hit by pitch, a passed ball or wild pitch on strike three, or catcher's interference." (No-hitters of less than nine complete innings were previously recognized by the league as official; however, several rule alterations in 1991 changed the rule to its current form.)

One perfect game, a special subcategory of no-hitter, has been pitched in Red Sox history. As defined by Major League Baseball, "in a perfect game, no batter reaches any base during the course of the game." Every opposing batter is retired. This feat was achieved by Cy Young in 1904. Young's perfect game, pitched on May 5, 1904, also was the first no-hitter in Red Sox history; the most recent Red Sox no-hitter was thrown by Jon Lester on May 19, 2008.

Two pitchers have thrown more than one no-hitter in a Red Sox uniform, Hall of Famer Cy Young and Dutch Leonard. Thirteen of the Red Sox no-hitters were thrown at home (the first four at the Huntington Avenue Grounds and the other nine at Fenway Park) and five on the road. Two were thrown in April, two in May, five in June, two in July, three in August, and four in September. The longest interval between Red Sox no-hitters was 35 years, 6 months, and 18 days, between the games pitched by Dave Morehead, on September 16, 1965 and Hideo Nomo, on April 4, 2001. The shortest interval between Red Sox no-hitters was merely 1 month and 6 days, between the games pitched by Earl Wilson on June 26, 1962 and Bill Monbouquette on August 1, 1962.

The Red Sox have no-hit the Chicago White Sox and Baltimore Orioles (formerly the "St. Louis Browns") the most: four times each. The White Sox were no-hit by Jesse Tannehill in 1904, Bill Dinneen in 1905, Parnell in 1956, and Monbouquette in 1962. The Browns and Orioles were no-hit by Smokey Joe Wood in 1911, Leonard in 1916, Hideo Nomo in 2001, and Clay Buchholz in 2007. The Red Sox have won all of their no-hitters (three times in major league history a team has thrown a nine-inning no-hitter and lost the game). The most baserunners allowed in a Red Sox no-hitter was five, by Dutch Leonard in 1918. Of the 18 Red Sox no-hitters, four have been won by a score of 4–0 and another four by a score of 2–0, making those final scores more common than any other results. The largest margin of victory in a Red Sox no-hitter was 10–0, in wins by Derek Lowe in 2002 and Clay Buchholz in 2007. The smallest margin of victory was 1–0, Monbouquette's no-hitter in 1962.

12 different managers have led the team during the franchise's 18 no-hitters. 15 different home plate umpires presided over the franchise's 18 no-hitters. Jason Varitek caught four of the team's no-hitters, setting a major-league record for no-hitters caught by a catcher, which has since been tied by Carlos Ruiz.

List of no-hitters in Red Sox history

See also
List of Major League Baseball no-hitters

References
General reference

Inline citations

no-hitters
Boston Red Sox